"Don't Look Back!" is the 11th single by Japanese idol girl group NMB48. It was released on March 31, 2015. This single and SKE48's Coquettish Jūtai Chū were released on the same day, and SKE48 placed 1st in Oricon's Daily Charts on its first day with 573,074 copies sold. NMB48 thus placed 2nd with 381,650 copies sold.

Background 
This single was released in 7 versions: Type A (limited/regular), Type B (limited/regular), Type C (limited/regular) and Theater Edition. The title song was first performed on Music Station on February 13, 2015.

Track list

Type-A regular

Type-A limited

Type-B regular

Type-C limited

Type-C regular

Type-C limited

Theater Edition

Members

Don't look back! 
Team N: Yuki Kashiwagi, Yuuka Kato, Riho Kotani, Kei Jonishi, Aika Nishimura, Sayaka Yamamoto, Akari Yoshida, Ririka Sutou, Yuuri Ota
Team M: Miru Shiroma, Airi Tanigawa, Reina Fujie, Sae Murase, Fuuko Yagura, Nana Yamada, Rina Kushiro
Team BII: Miori Ichikawa, Ayaka Umeda, Kanako Kadowaki, Konomi Kusaka, Nagisa Shibuya, Shu Yabushita, Miyuki Watanabe

Renai Petenshi 
Team N: Yuuri Ota, Yuki Kashiwagi, Yuuka Kato, Rika Kishino, Saki Kono, Narumi Koga, Riho Kotani, Kei Jonishi, Ririka Sutou, Aika Nishimura, Anna Murashige, Kanako Muro, Natsumi Yamagishi, Yuki Yamaguchi, Sayaka Yamamoto, Akari Yoshida, Natsuko Akashi, Yuumi Ishida, Eriko Jo, Rurina Nishizawa, Rina Yamao

Heart Sakebu 
Team M: Yuki Azuma, Akari Ishizuka, Ayaka Okita, Rena Kawakami, Momoka Kinoshita, Rina Kushiro, Rina Kondo, Miru Shiroma, Yui Takano, Sara Takei, Airi Tanigawa, Reina Fujie, Arisa Miura, Mao Mita, Ayaka Murakami, Sae Murase, Fuuko Yagura, Nana Yamada, Azusa Uemura, Megumi Matsumura, Reina Nakano, Ayaka Morita, Mizuki Uno

Minna, Daisuki 
Team M: Nana Yamada

Romantic Snow 
Team BII: Anna Ijiri, Kanae Iso, Miori Ichikawa, Mirei Ueda, Ayaka Umeda, Kanako Kadowaki, Emika Kamieda, Chihiro Kawakami, Haruna Kinoshita, Konomi Kusaka, Hazuki Kurokawa, Nagisa Shibuya, Akane Takayanagi, Kokoro Naiki, Momoka Hayashi, Shu Yabushita, Miyuki Watanabe, Mai Odan, Honoka Terui, Chiho Matsuoka

Nietzsche Senpai 
(Namba Teppoudai Sono 6)
Team N: Ririka Sutou, Natsuko Akashi, Eriko Jo, Rina Yamao
Team M: Reina Nakano
Team BII: Mirei Ueda, Chihiro Kawakami, Haruna Kinoshita

Sotsugyou Ryokou 
Team N: Kishino Rika, Kotani Riho, Jonishi Kei, Yamagishi Natsumi, Yamaguchi Yuki, Yamamoto Sayaka, Yoshida Akari
Team M: Yamada Nana, Kawakami Rena, Kinoshita Momoka, Kondo Rina, Shiroma Miru, Okita Ayaka
Team BII: Kadowaki Kanako, Kinoshita Haruna, Watanabe Miyuki

References 

2015 singles
2015 songs
Japanese-language songs
NMB48 songs
Billboard Japan Hot 100 number-one singles
Song articles with missing songwriters